AOF may stand for:

 Academy of Finance, the finance-based high school education program sponsored by the National Academy Foundation.
 Afrique Occidentale Française (French West Africa), a former grouping of French colonies.
 Aggregate Objective Function, a single functional to combine all of the objectives in Multiobjective optimization.
 Alexisonfire, a Canadian post-hardcore band.
 Altorientalische Forschung, a German academic journal (as AoF).
 American Osteopathic Foundation, the philanthropic arm of the American Osteopathic Association.
 Foresters Friendly Society, formerly known as Ancient Order of Foresters.
 Ancient Order of Freesmiths, a secret society with roots in Medieval Germany.
 Append-Only File, a software technique of logging database updates for persistence.
 The Art of Fugue (BWV 1080), a work by Johann Sebastian Bach.
 Art of Fighting, a competitive fighting game series produced by SNK (now known as SNK Playmore).
 Articles of Faith (band), a hardcore punk band from Chicago.
 ATV Offroad Fury, an offroad racing video game series
 Atheists of Florida, a non-profit organisation in Florida, US.
 Australian Olympic Federation, a former name of the Australian Olympic Committee
 Avon Old Farms School, an all-boys boarding high school in Avon, CT.